Rev. Charles Irving Carpenter (January 13, 1906 – February 22, 1994) was an American pastor and the first Chief of Chaplains of the United States Air Force.

Early life and education
Born in Wilmington, Delaware, in 1906, Carpenter was an ordained Methodist pastor. He was a graduate of Bucknell University and Drew University.

Career
Carpenter originally joined the United States Army in 1936 and was assigned to Fort H. G. Wright.

In 1942, Carpenter was assigned to The Pentagon to establish chaplaincy work in the United States Army Air Forces. He was later reassigned to the United States Air Forces in Europe during the closing months of World War II. Following the war, he returned to The Pentagon.

After the creation of the United States Air Force, Carpenter was named the first Chief of Chaplains in 1948. The following year, he was appointed to the grade of major general. Carpenter remained Chief of Chaplains until 1958, when he took up assignment at the United States Air Force Academy.

Awards he received include the Legion of Merit with oak leaf cluster and the Belgian Military Cross, First Class.

Death
Carpenter died on February 22, 1994.

References

External links
Man of the Month - Charles I. Carpenter
Valor Awards - Military Times valor awards for Charles I. Carpenter.
Charles I. Carpenter Papers at Archives of DePauw University and Indiana United Methodism.
Obit from the New York Times on Charles I. Carpenter.
USAF Bio on Charles I. Carpenter.
Religion in the Military - Mentions Chaplain Charles I. Carpenter's appointment by President Truman.
Air Force, ANG chaplains reflect on milestones - Air Chaplain Charles I. Carpenter drafted the order for USAF Chaplains.

1906 births
1994 deaths
People from Wilmington, Delaware
United States Air Force generals
United States Army officers
Chiefs of Chaplains of the United States Air Force
American Methodist clergy
Recipients of the Legion of Merit
United States Army personnel of World War II
Bucknell University alumni
Drew University alumni
World War II chaplains
20th-century American clergy